Unidad Educativa Bilingüe Interamericana (UEBI: "Inter-American Bilingual Education Institute") was founded in September 1959. It is an institution based on Christian principles in the city of Cuenca, Ecuador. It was established by Evangelical Lutheran missionaries from the United States and later passed into the ownership of private individuals, becoming a limited company. It runs three parallel school and college sections.

References 

 Magazine "50 years of Unidad Educativa Bilingue Interamericana"

External links 
 Organization website

Secondary schools in Ecuador